Lühder's bushshrike (Laniarius luehderi) is a species of bird (a shrike) in the family Malaconotidae. It is found in Angola, Burundi, Cameroon, Republic of the Congo, Democratic Republic of the Congo, Equatorial Guinea, Gabon, Kenya, Nigeria, Rwanda, South Sudan, Tanzania, and Uganda. The common name and Latin binomial commemorate the German naturalist ornithologist W. Lühder.

References

Lühder's bushshrike
Birds of Central Africa
Lühder's bushshrike
Taxonomy articles created by Polbot